WKDE may refer to:

 WKDE-FM, a radio station (105.5 FM) licensed to Altavista, Virginia, United States
 WGVY, a radio station (1000 AM) licensed to Altavista, Virginia, which held the call sign WKDE from 1962 to 2018